Catherine Birgersdotter of Bjelbo (fl. 1245–1289) was a 13th-century Swedish noblewoman of the House of Bjelbo (Folkungaätten). She was Princess consort of Anhalt-Zerbst.

Biography
Catherine Birgersdotter was the daughter of the Swedish regent Birger Magnusson (Birger Jarl) and Princess Ingeborg Eriksdotter of Sweden.  Her older brother Valdemar Birgersson was King of Sweden from 1250 to 1275.
On 17 October 1259, Catherine married Siegfried I, Prince of Anhalt-Zerbst(c. 1230 –  1298) regent the Principality of Anhalt and a member of the House of Ascania.

Issue 
They had ten children:

Albert I, Prince of Anhalt-Zerbst (d. 17 August 1316).
Prince Henry of Anhalt-Zerbst (d. 13 December 1340 / 28 March 1341 ?), Provost of Halberstadt.
Prince Siegfried of Anhalt-Zerbst (d. 25 February 1317), a canon in Magdeburg.
Prince Hermann of Anhalt-Zerbst (d. aft. 24 June 1328), a Teutonic knight, Comtur at Dessau in 1327.
Princess Agnes of Anhalt-Zerbst (d. aft. 17 August 1316), Abbess of Coswig.
Princess Hedwig of Anhalt-Zerbst (d. aft. 24 February 1319), Abbess of Coswig.
Princess Elisabeth of Anhalt-Zerbst (d. aft. 17 August 1316), a nun in Coswig.
Princess Judith of Anhalt-Zerbst (d. aft. 17 August 1316), a nun in Coswig.
Princess Konstanze of Anhalt-Zerbst (d. aft. 17 August 1316), a nun in Coswig.
Princess Sophie of Anhalt-Zerbst (c.1260 - aft. 9 January 1290); married Ludwig of Hakeborn (c.1235 - 5 October 1298), son of Albrecht III, Count of Hackeborn

References 

1289 deaths
Year of birth unknown
13th-century Swedish nobility
House of Bjelbo
House of Ascania
13th-century Swedish women
13th-century German women
13th-century German nobility